Stathmonotus tekla is a species of chaenopsid blenny found in the Caribbean Sea from southern Florida through the West Indies and the coast of Central America to Colombia.

References

Fish described in 1910
tekla